The Ambassador of the United Kingdom to Romania is the United Kingdom's foremost diplomatic representative in Romania, and head of the UK's diplomatic mission in Romania.  The official title is His Britannic Majesty's Ambassador to Romania.

Heads of mission
Consul-General to Wallachia and Moldavia
 1813–1826?: William Wilkinson (consul appointed by the Levant Company
 1826–1834: E.L. Blutte
 1834–1858: Robert G. Colquhoun
 1859–1874: John Green
 1874–1876: Hon. Hussey Vivian
 1876–1878: Charles Mansfield

Envoy Extraordinary and Minister Plenipotentiary
 1880–1886: Sir William White
 1887–1892: Sir Frank Lascelles
 1892–1894: Sir John Walsham, 2nd Baronet
 1894–1897: Sir Hugh Wyndham
 1897–1905: John Kennedy
 1906–1910: Conyngham Greene
 1911–1912: Walter Townley
 1912–1920: Sir George Barclay
 1920–1926: Sir Herbert Dering
 1926–1929: Robert Greg
 1929–1935: Michael Palairet
 1935–1941: Sir Reginald Hoare
 1941–1946: No representation due to World War II
 1947–1948: Adrian Holman
 1949–1951: Walter Roberts
 1951–1954: William Sullivan
 1954–1956: Dermot MacDermot
 1956–1959: Alan Dudley
 1959–1961: David Scott Fox
 1961–1963: Dalton Murray

Ambassador Extraordinary and Plenipotentiary
 1963–1965: Dalton Murray
 1965–1967: Leslie Glass
 1967–1968: Sir John Chadwick
 1969–1971: Denis Laskey
 1972–1975: Derick Ashe
 1975–1977: Jeffrey Petersen
 1977–1979: Reginald Secondé
 1980–1983: Paul Holmer
 1983–1986: Philip McKearney
 1986–1989: Hugh Arbuthnott
 1989–1992: Michael Atkinson
 1992–1996: Andrew Bache
 1996–2000: Christopher Crabbie
 2000–2002: Richard Ralph
 2002–2006: Quinton Quayle
 2006–2010: Robin Barnett
 2010–2014: Martin Harris
 2014–2018: Paul Brummell

 2018–: Andrew Noble

Regional Consulates
Consuls
 1922–1924: Lionel Keyser (Consul for the Romanian Old Kingdom, Dobruja, and the portion of Bessarabia south of Orhei and Baltzi)
 1924-?: Laurence Robinson (Consul-General for Bukowina, Bessarabia, the Romanian Old Kingdom and Dobrudja)
 1922-?: Charles Goodwin (Consul for Transylvania, the Romanian Banat, Crisiana and Maramureş)
 1935–1939: Archibald Robertson (Consul for Transylvania, the Romanian Banat, Crisiana and Maramureş)
 1939-?: Norman Mayers (for Timiş, Olt, Bucegi, Mureș and Someş)

References

External links
UK and Romania, gov.uk

United Kingdom
 
Romania
United Kingdom